Henry Horton (18 April 1923 – 2 November 1998) was an English sportsman who played cricket for Hampshire in the 1950s and 1960s, having previously played a handful of times for Worcestershire in the 1940s. He also played football for Blackburn, Southampton, Bradford Park Avenue and Hereford.

Cricket career 
Horton came late to full-time cricket, having spent most of his twenties concentrating on his football career. He joined Hampshire in 1953, but did not achieve a regular place in the side until 1955, the season when the West Indian Test batsman Roy Marshall qualified for the county. For the next dozen years, Horton batted mostly at No 3, usually following the opening partnership of Marshall and the all-rounder Jimmy Gray, and the three players were responsible for a high proportion of the runs scored by a side that was perennially weak in batting but strong in bowling.

Horton was essentially a defensive player, contrasting with the flamboyance of Marshall. He was a right-handed batsman with a curious and ungainly crouching stance, once described as if he was sitting on a shooting stick. But he made a lot of runs at a good average, and passed 1,000 runs in 12 consecutive seasons, going on to 2,000 in three of them. His total of 2,428 runs in 1959 is the sixth highest aggregate in Hampshire history, beaten only by Phil Mead (four times) and once by Marshall. He was a big contributor to Hampshire's two most successful County Championship seasons to that time: 1958, when the county came second to Surrey, and 1961, when it won the Championship for the first time.

Horton remained fit into his mid-forties, and completed 1,000 for the last time in 1966. The following year, with younger players coming into the side, he played a few games and then retired from playing. He became a first-class umpire for a few seasons, then retired back to Herefordshire to live with his sisters in their home town of Colwall.

Family 
He was the younger brother of Joseph Horton, who played more than 60 times for Worcestershire in the 1930s and who died just four days after him.

References

External links
 

1923 births
1998 deaths
English cricketers
Hampshire cricketers
Worcestershire cricketers
Players cricketers
English cricket umpires
English footballers
Blackburn Rovers F.C. players
Southampton F.C. players
Bradford (Park Avenue) A.F.C. players
Hereford United F.C. players
Association footballers not categorized by position